The 1982–83 season was Mansfield Town's 46th season in the Football League and 9th in the Fourth Division they finished in 10th position with 61 points.

Final league table

Results

Football League Fourth Division

FA Cup

League Cup

Group Cup

Squad statistics
 Squad list sourced from

References
General
 Mansfield Town 1982–83 at soccerbase.com (use drop down list to select relevant season)

Specific

Mansfield Town F.C. seasons
Mansfield Town